South Dakota Highway 65 (SD 65) is a state route in north-central region of the U.S. state of South Dakota. It begins at U.S. Highway 212 east of Dupree, then runs northerly to the North Dakota border near McIntosh, where it continues as North Dakota Highway 31.

History
When first designated in the 1920s, South Dakota 65 consisted of three segments, one stretching from the North Dakota border to the Grand River, one from an intersection with South Dakota Highway 18 in Isabel to an intersection with US 212 in Dupree, and the final segment stretching from US 16 in Kadoka to the Nebraska border south of Martin.

Construction of a new road led to the connection of the two northern segments by 1932.  The segment south of US 16 was re-designated as an extension of South Dakota Highway 63 in 1929.

Major intersections

Legal definition
The route of SD 65 is defined in South Dakota Codified Laws § 31-4-174.

References

External links

South Dakota Highways Page: Highways 61-100

065
Transportation in Ziebach County, South Dakota
Transportation in Dewey County, South Dakota
Transportation in Corson County, South Dakota